Only for You may refer to:
 Only for You (film), a 2007 romance film 
 Only for You (Sofia Rotaru album) (1979)
 Only for You (Show Lo album) (2011)
 "Only for You" (song), a song by Sarah Engels from Heartbeat
 Onlyforyou (horse), a racehorse